Élisabeth Filhol (born 1 May 1965 in Mende, Lozère) is a French writer.

Biography 
Filhol works in the world of management and in particular in consulting works councils. She lives in the region of Angers. Her first novel La Centrale focuses on the working conditions of the temporary workers of the nuclear industry, and particularly the nuclear plants of Chinon and le Blayais. For this later novel, she won the 2010 Prix France Culture/Télérama.

Work 
2010: 
2014: Bois II, Paris, Éditions P.O.L, 272 p. 
2019: Doggerland

References

External links 
 Élisabeth Filhol on the site of Éditions P.O.L
 Elisabeth Filhol : "Le vrai déclic s'est produit lorsque j'ai osé écrire je" on Télérama (27 March 2010)
 Elisabeth Filhol, La Centrale (1er roman) (POL) on France Culture
 Bois II on P.O.L

21st-century French novelists
French women novelists
1965 births
People from Mende, Lozère
Living people
21st-century French women writers